Jovan "Jovo" Kapičić, born Jovan Kapa, (Cyrillic: Јован Јово Капичић); 2 September 1919 – 9 December 2013) was a Yugoslav General and post-war communist politician.

He was awarded the Order of the People's Hero on 10 July 1950.

Early and personal life
Kapičić was born on 2 September 1919 in the Italian city of Gaeta where the Kingdom of Italy authorities had set up a large base for the Italian-supported exiled soldiers of the Royal Montenegrin Army following their unsuccessful 1919 Christmas Uprising against the Karađorđević dynasty. Jovo's father Milo Kapa was born in Ugnji near Cetinje, Montenegro, and he completed a theology degree. Later he was a theology professor and in 1918, he became a komita and joined the Montenegrin Federalist Party. Along with Jovo, Milo had two more sons (Pavle and Vlado) and a daughter Anka. Jovo was also an Ambassador of Socialist Federal Republic of Yugoslavia in People's Republic of Hungary in 1956 after the Hungarian Revolution of 1956.Jovo joined Communist Party of Yugoslavia in 1936.He participated in Demonstrations in Yugoslavia of 1941 in Belgrade.

Jovo's son Dragan is a retired basketball player and his grandson Stefan Kapičić is an actor.

References

External links

1919 births
2013 deaths
People from Gaeta
Montenegrin communists
Yugoslav communists
Yugoslav Partisans members
Generals of the Yugoslav People's Army
Recipients of the Order of the People's Hero
Burials in Montenegro
Yugoslav expatriates in Italy